Zamil Steel (Zamil Steel Holding Company) is a manufacturing and fabrication group that provides products, engineering systems and services for the construction industry. The company's headquarters is in Saudi Arabia. The company expanded its operations with the establishment of new factories in Egypt, India, United Arab Emirates and Vietnam.

History
Founded in 1930 by Abdullah Al Hamad Al Zamil, presently known as Zamil Group Holding, established a joint venture with Soule Steel of USA, begins production and becomes the first company to manufacture PEB (Pre-engineered building) in Saudi Arabia.

Zamil Steel Holding is owned by Zamil Industrial Investment Co. (Zamil Industrial), a Saudi Joint Stock company formed in 1998, and is listed in Tadawul (Saudi Stock Exchange).

Achievements and awards
2012 - Environmental Performance Certificate.
2003 - Golden Dragon Prize

See also 
Nomenclature of PEB (Pre-engineered building).
List of companies of Saudi Arabia
Metal Building Manufacturers Association

References

External links

Manufacturing companies established in 1977
Construction and civil engineering companies established in 1977
Steel companies of Saudi Arabia
Companies based in Dammam
Holding companies established in 1977
Saudi Arabian companies established in 1977